Alessandro Dalmazzi (born 3 August 1994) is an Italian professional footballer who plays as a centre back for  club Fidelis Andria.

Career
Born in Orbetello, Dalmazzi started his career in Grosseto. He was promoted to the first team in 2013–14 season, and made his professional debut on Serie B on 18 May 2013 against Bari.

In 2014, he was loaned to Eccellenza club Viterbese. After won the promotion, he joined permanently to the club.

On 24 August 2016, he moved to Rieti.

On 9 July 2019, he joined to Campobasso. The club won the promotion to Serie C in 2020–21 Serie D season. Dalmazzi made his Serie C debut on 29 August against Avellino.

On 27 August 2022, Dalmazzi signed with Fidelis Andria.

Honours
Viterbese
 Serie D: 2015–16

References

External links
 
 

1994 births
People from Orbetello
Sportspeople from the Province of Grosseto
Footballers from Tuscany
Living people
Italian footballers
Association football central defenders
Serie C players
Serie D players
Eccellenza players
U.S. Grosseto 1912 players
U.S. Viterbese 1908 players
F.C. Rieti players
S.S.D. Città di Campobasso players
S.S. Fidelis Andria 1928 players